Syria participated in the 2009 Asian Indoor Games in Hanoi, Vietnam on 30 October – 8 November 2009.

Medal winners

References

Nations at the 2009 Asian Indoor Games
2009 in Syrian sport
Syria at the Asian Indoor Games